"The Ox" is an instrumental piece by the Who. It was on their debut album My Generation.  The tune was improvised by Pete Townshend, John Entwistle, Keith Moon and keyboardist Nicky Hopkins. This track appears as the B-side of "The Kids Are Alright" on the single's UK release.  The tune was also on the compilation album Thirty Years of Maximum R&B.  A jingle based on this tune was released as "Top Gear" on both reissues of The Who Sell Out.  It is the oldest known recorded track by The Who.  The title is a nickname given to Entwistle by the band, because of his strong constitution and seeming ability to "Eat, drink or do more than the rest of them."

The song was very rarely played live by the Who.  The only known live appearance of this song was in a medley of "My Generation" at the Concertgebouw in Amsterdam, Netherlands on 29 September 1969, part of the Tommy tour.

Rolling Stones John Swenson described "The Ox" and "My Generation" to be "sonic marvels of the time" due to Townshend's feedback technique on these songs.

References

1965 songs
Songs written by Pete Townshend
Songs written by John Entwistle
The Who songs
Song recordings produced by Shel Talmy
Rock instrumentals